The 2013 Slovenian Supercup was the ninth edition of the Slovenian Supercup, an annual football match contested by the winners of the previous season's Slovenian PrvaLiga and Slovenian Cup competitions. The match was played on 7 July 2013 at the Arena Petrol stadium in Celje between the 2012–13 Slovenian PrvaLiga winners Maribor and the 2012–13 Slovenian PrvaLiga runners-up Olimpija Ljubljana, as Maribor won both the Slovenian Cup and the Slovenian PrvaLiga in the previous season.

Match details

See also
2012–13 Slovenian PrvaLiga
2012–13 Slovenian Cup
2013–14 NK Maribor season

External links
Slovenian Supercup

Slovenian Supercup
Supercup
Slovenian Supercup 2013